Bellflower is a city located in southeast Los Angeles County, California, in the Los Angeles metropolitan area. It was founded in 1906 and incorporated on September 3, 1957. As of the 2020 census, the city had a total population of 79,190, up from 76,616 at the 2010 census. This made it the 65th most densely populated city in the United States, of cities over 50,000 residents (and the 8th most densely populated city in California).

History
The site was formerly rich farmland watered by artesian wells and floodwaters of the now-contained San Gabriel River. In 1906, F.E. Woodruff, a local real estate investor, founded the first municipality on the site, which was named Somerset in 1909 when a post office was established there. However, the proponents of the name 'Bellflower' claimed that the US Post Office Department rejected the name 'Somerset' to prevent confusion with Somerset, Colorado. The present name is derived from the bellflower apple, which was grown in local orchards during the early 1900s.

Originally settled by dairy farmers of Dutch, Japanese, and Portuguese descent, Bellflower and neighboring Paramount served first as the apple and later the milk production centers for Southern California, until soaring post-World War II property values forced most of the farmers to move several miles east to the Dairy Valley/Dairyland/Dairy City area (now the cities of Cerritos, La Palma, and Cypress). These farms were in turn converted into large housing subdivisions for Los Angeles's growing population that worked in the region's skilled industrial and service sectors. As a result, amongst the highly diverse backgrounds in Bellflower, there remains today a notable number of residents of Dutch descent; Bellflower is one of the only cities in the US to boast multiple Dutch grocery stores.

After Bellflower was incorporated in 1957, its gradual metamorphosis from agricultural center to residential suburb continued. From the 1950s through the late 1960s, Bellflower Boulevard, the city's main thoroughfare, was a thriving commercial strip for shopping. Numerous retail and franchise restaurant firms began on this street, which also featured middle- and high-end boutiques, arts and crafts shops, and other small shopkeeps alongside larger department stores and banks. Today, Bellflower is an urban community within greater Southeast Los Angeles, and ranks amongst the most densely populated cities in the United States. It is a sister city with Los Mochis, Sinaloa, Mexico.

Geography

Bellflower is bordered by Downey on the north and northwest, Norwalk and Cerritos on the east, Lakewood on the south, Long Beach on the southwest, and Paramount on the west. Bellflower is part of Southeast Los Angeles County and the "Gateway Cities Council of Governments" (GCOG).

Demographics

2010
At the 2010 census Bellflower had a population of 76,616. The racial makeup of Bellflower was 32,337 (42.2%) White (19.5% Non-Hispanic White), 10,760 (14.0%) African American, 731 (1.0%) Native American, 8,865 (11.6%) Asian, 615 (0.8%) Pacific Islander, 19,732 (25.8%) from other races, and 3,576 (4.7%) from two or more races. Hispanic or Latino of any race were 40,085 persons (52.3%).

The census reported that 75,877 people (99.0% of the population) lived in households, 399 (0.5%) lived in non-institutionalized group quarters, and 340 (0.4%) were institutionalized.

There were 23,651 households, 11,029 (46.6%) had children under the age of 18 living in them, 10,992 (46.5%) were opposite-sex married couples living together, 4,812 (20.3%) had a female householder with no husband present, 1,965 (8.3%) had a male householder with no wife present.  There were 1,666 (7.0%) unmarried opposite-sex partnerships, and 170 (0.7%) same-sex married couples or partnerships. 4,618 households (19.5%) were one person and 1,540 (6.5%) had someone living alone who was 65 or older. The average household size was 3.21.  There were 17,769 families (75.1% of households); the average family size was 3.67.

The age distribution was 21,749 people (28.4%) under the age of 18, 8,493 people (11.1%) aged 18 to 24, 22,418 people (29.3%) aged 25 to 44, 17,339 people (22.6%) aged 45 to 64, and 6,617 people (8.6%) who were 65 or older.  The median age was 31.9 years. For every 100 females, there were 94.4 males.  For every 100 females age 18 and over, there were 90.6 males.

There were 24,897 housing units at an average density of 4,034.9 per square mile, of the occupied units 9,459 (40.0%) were owner-occupied and 14,192 (60.0%) were rented. The homeowner vacancy rate was 1.7%; the rental vacancy rate was 5.1%.  31,897 people (41.6% of the population) lived in owner-occupied housing units and 43,980 people (57.4%) lived in rental housing units.

According to the 2010 United States Census, Bellflower had a median household income of $49,637, with 17.1% of the population living below the federal poverty line.

2000
At the 2000 census there were 72,878 people in 23,367 households, including 17,128 families, in the city. The population density was 11,999.5 inhabitants per square mile (4,635.6/km). The racial makeup of the city was 22.37% White American, 33.09% Black or African American, 0.92% Native American, 9.69% Asian, 0.70% Pacific Islander, 24.38% from other races, and 5.13% from two or more races. 43.23% of the population were Hispanic or Latino of any race.
Of the 23,367 households 43.7% had children under the age of 18 living with them, 47.0% were married couples living together, 19.0% had a female householder with no husband present, and 26.7% were non-families. 21.1% of households were one person and 7.5% were one person aged 65 or older. The average household size was 3.09 and the average family size was 3.59.

The age distribution was 31.9% under the age of 18, 10.3% from 18 to 24, 32.0% from 25 to 44, 17.4% from 45 to 64, and 8.4% 65 or older. The median age was 30 years. For every 100 females, there were 95.1 males. For every 100 females age 18 and over, there were 90.6 males.

The median household income was $39,362 and the median family income was $42,822. Males had a median income of $32,658 versus $28,012 for females. The per capita income for the city was $15,982 and was below the "poverty rate". About 12.8% of per capita family households and 15.8% of the population were below the poverty line, including 20.7% of those under age 18 and 10.0% of those age 65 or over.

Economy

Top employers
According to the city's 2021 Annual Comprehensive Financial Report, the top employers in the city are:

Government 

Infrastructure 
Fire protection in Bellflower is provided by the Los Angeles County Fire Department from stations 23 and 98. Ambulance transport is provided by Care Ambulance Service.

The Los Angeles County Sheriff's Department operates the Lakewood Station in Lakewood, serving Bellflower. In addition the sheriff's department operates the Bellflower Substation in Bellflower.

The United States Postal Service Bellflower Post Office is located at 9835 Flower Street.

Transportation

The Artesia Freeway (State Route 91) passes east–west through the southern portion of Bellflower, the San Gabriel River Freeway (Interstate 605) runs north–south just east of the city, and the Century Freeway (Interstate 105) runs east–west just north of the city.

Bellflower is served by bus service from Los Angeles County Metropolitan Transportation Authority (MTA) and Long Beach Transit. The city also operates Bellflower Bus, a fixed-route local bus.

Education 

Most of Bellflower is within the Bellflower Unified School District. St. John Bosco High School, and Valley Christian Elementary both privately run, are also in Bellflower. The Clifton M. Brakensiek Library is a branch of the County of Los Angeles Public Library.

Notable people

Anthony Brown (born 1992), basketball player in the Israeli Basketball Premier League
 Chris Carter, television and film producer, director and writer, creator of The X-Files
 Misty Copeland, principal ballet dancer from American Ballet Theatre
 Ronnie Correy, motorcycle speedway rider
 Kirk Fletcher, electric blues guitarist, singer and songwriter, was born in Bellflower in 1975.
 Nomar Garciaparra, Major League Baseball shortstop, 6-time All-Star, 2-time batting champion, TV commentator; attended St. John Bosco High School
 A.J. Gass, former Canadian Football League player
 Anthony Gose, Major League Baseball outfielder, currently in Detroit Tigers organization
 Shauna Grant (1963–1984), screen name of pornographic actress Colleen Applegate, was born here 
 Don Hahn, producer of Disney's "Beauty and the Beast" and "The Lion King"
 Trevor Hoffman, Major League Baseball relief pitcher, 7-time All-Star, born in Bellflower
 Jeff Kent, Major League Baseball second baseman, 5-time All-Star, 2000 National League MVP; born in Bellflower
 Vanessa Lam, figure skater, 2012 Junior Grand Prix finalist
 Darryll Lewis, former National Football League player
 Adam Liberatore, Major League Baseball relief pitcher with Los Angeles Dodgers
 Evan Longoria, Major League Baseball third baseman, 3-time All-Star graduated from St. John Bosco High School in 2003
 Kimberly McCullough, actress, General Hospital
 Wendi McLendon-Covey, actress, appeared in film Bridesmaids, was born in Bellflower
 Valentino Pascucci, professional baseball player, 2004–11
 Jerry Quarry, heavyweight boxer, former #1 ranked contender
 Carlos Quentin, Major League Baseball outfielder, 2-time All-Star
 Sergio Santos, Major League Baseball relief pitcher 2010-15
 Brandon Sermons, professional football player
 Anneliese van der Pol, actress; attended Ramona Elementary School and Bellflower High School
 Derrick Williams, professional basketball player with  Maccabi Tel Aviv of the Israeli Basketball Premier League and the EuroLeague; formerly with five NBA teams, 2011 Pac-10 Player of the Year
 Ron Yary, professional football player in College and Pro Football Hall of Fame; graduated Bellflower High School in 1964

References

External links 

 

 

 
Cities in Los Angeles County, California
Gateway Cities
Incorporated cities and towns in California